Yulee High School is a comprehensive four-year school located in Yulee, Florida. The original school closed in 1965 when Florida desegregated public schools. Following desegregation, students were allowed to choose between attending West Nassau or Fernandina Beach. The current institution opened in 2006, although Yulee had been the site of a high school earlier, from the 1930s to the 1960s. The initial graduating class of Yulee High School, in 2007, had a 71% graduation rate, 23% of whom graduated with honors.

The mascot of the sports teams for YHS is the Hornet.

Notable alumni
 Derrick Henry – NFL running back for the Tennessee Titans and 2015 Heisman Trophy winner.

References

External links

 Yulee High School Home Page

Public high schools in Florida
High schools in Nassau County, Florida
Educational institutions established in 2006
2006 establishments in Florida